Hopiichnus is an ichnogenus of dinosaur footprint. It is probably synonymous with Anomoepus.

See also

 List of dinosaur ichnogenera

References

Dinosaur trace fossils
Ornithischians